Al-Salam or As-Salam Mosque may refer to:

Al-Salam Mosque, Syria
Al-Salam Mosque, Odessa
Mezquita As-Salam, Santiago, Chile